was the sixth of ten s built for the Imperial Japanese Navy in the mid-1930s under the Circle Two Supplementary Naval Expansion Program (Maru Ni Keikaku).

History

The Asashio-class destroyers were larger and more capable that the preceding , as Japanese naval architects were no longer constrained by the provisions of the London Naval Treaty. These light cruiser-sized vessels were designed to take advantage of Japan’s lead in torpedo technology, and to accompany the Japanese main striking force and in both day and night attacks against the United States Navy as it advanced across the Pacific Ocean, according to Japanese naval strategic projections. Despite being one of the most powerful classes of destroyers in the world at the time of their completion, none survived the Pacific War.

Yamagumo, built at the Fujinagata Shipyards was laid down on 4 November 1936, launched on 24 July 1937 and commissioned on 15 January 1938.

Operational history
At the time of the attack on Pearl Harbor, Yamagumo, under the command of Lieutenant Commander Yasuji Koga, was flagship of the 3rd Special Attack Force in the invasion of the Philippines, covering landings at Camiguin Island and Lingayen.  However, on 31 December, she suffered severe damage after striking a Japanese naval mine. She was towed to Hong Kong for repairs in early February, and then limped to Yokosuka Naval Arsenal by 7 April. She remained under repair until 15 May 1942 but remained based at Yokosuka through the end of August 1942. She made one escort mission to Saipan at the end of December 1942. In February 1943, while attempting to escort Tatsuta Maru to Truk, she was unable to prevent the former luxury liner from being torpedoed by the submarine  with the loss of 1,400 lives just east-southeast of Mikurajima.

On 15 September 1943 Yamagumo was assigned to the IJN 3rd Fleet, and escorted a convoy from Shanghai to Rabaul, returning to Shanghai on 18 October. She duplicated the mission in November, after which she was assigned to escort the submarine tender  and cruiser  from Truk to Kure. On 19 November 1943, she sank the submarine  with depth charges. The 42 survivors were rescued and taken as prisoners-of-war (POWs), then were transferred to the escort carrier , until she was sunk by the submarine , in which 20 out of 21 went down with the ship. Only 1 was rescued and returned to Japan along with the other 21 survivors aboard  to serve as POWs until the end of the war.

Subsequently, she was assigned to escort the tanker Nippon Maru in the Marshall Islands area.

On 1 January 1944 she suffered light damage when strafed during a Tokyo Express troop transport mission to Kavieng. She was escort for the tanker Kokuyo Maru in January, and made three additional troop transport runs in the Solomon Islands area in February. On 23 February, she returned to Yokosuka together with the transport Asaka Maru. While at Yokosuka, she was overhauled, and one of her main gun turrets was replaced by two triple Type 96 AA guns.

In early April, she escorted the aircraft carrier  to Guam, and back to Kure.
During the Battle of the Philippine Sea of 10–20 June 1944, she was part of Admiral Takatsugu Jōjima’s “Force B”, but did not see combat.

During the Battle of Leyte Gulf of 22–25 October 1944 she was part of Admiral Shōji Nishimura’s “Southern Force”. In the Battle of Surigao Strait, she was hit by torpedoes fired by the destroyer , and exploded, sinking at position . There were only two survivors. She was removed from the navy list on 10 January 1945.

Rediscovery
Yamagumo's wreck was discovered along with sister Michishio on 27 November 2017 by Microsoft co-founder Paul Allen's research ship RV Petrel. Both wrecks are 1 mile (1.6 km) apart in 380 ft (117 m) of water. Both wrecks were heavily encrusted with marine growth, which combined with their close proximity, made it impossible to distinguish the two ships.

Notes

References

External links
 CombinedFleet.com: Asashio-class destroyers
Yamagumo history
GlobalSecurity.org: Asashio class destroyers

Asashio-class destroyers
World War II destroyers of Japan
1937 ships
Maritime incidents in October 1944
Shipwrecks in the Sulu Sea
World War II shipwrecks in the Pacific Ocean
Shipwreck discoveries by Paul Allen
Ships built by Fujinagata Shipyards
2017 archaeological discoveries